Ribosomal protein L22 like 1 (RPL22L1), or eL22L1, is a protein that in humans is encoded by the RPL22L1 gene.

Function 
eL22L1 is a ribosomal protein paralog of the eL22 protein of the 60S ribosomal subunit. This paralog is divergent from the normal copy, and is expressed when the normal copy is deleted from mice. This compensation implies a ribosome function similar to the normal copy, though eL22L1 has also been implicates in other extraribosomal roles including pre-mRNA splicing regulation in zebrafish.

See also 
RPL22
60S ribosomal subunit

References